Vishu (Malayalam: വിഷു), the traditional Malayali New Year, is a Hindu festival celebrated in the Indian state of Kerala, Tulu Nadu region of Karnataka, and Mahe district. The festival marks the first day of Medam, the first month of the Malayalam Calendar followed in Kerala. It therefore always falls in the middle of April in the Gregorian calendar on 14 or 15 April every year.

The festival is marked by family time, preparing colourful auspicious items and viewing these as the first thing on the Vishu day (Vishukkani). In particular, Malayalis seek to view the golden blossoms of the Indian laburnum (Kani Konna), money or silver items, cloth (pattu), mirror, rice, coconut, cucumber, fruits and other harvest products. Days before Vishu, people start bursting fireworks at their houses and it concludes with lot of fireworks on day of Vishu.People wear new clothes (Koti) and they eat a feast called Sadhya. In Kaineettam, elders give a small amount of pocket money to children.

Etymology and origin

Vishu, from Sanskrit Viṣuvam, literally means 'equal', and it connoted to the celebration of spring equinox in the past. The spring equinox however occurs 24 days before the day of Vishu, on 21 March/Meenam  7, due to precession of equinoxes.

Religious significance
The Vishu marks the first day of the astronomical year and hence Lord Vishnu and his incarnation Lord Krishna are worshipped on the day of Vishu, as Lord Vishnu is considered as the God of Time. It was on this day that Lord Krishna killed the demon Narakasura and because of this Krishna idols are kept in the Vishu kani.

The current Vishu year is 01-01-5124 Vishu Vasrhsam (same year as Kali Yuga, as of April 15, 2022). Records that Vishu has been celebrated in Kerala occurred from the reign of Sthanu Ravi since 844 AD, when the new era calendar (Kolla Varsham) was initiated replacing the older calendar with 13 months in a year.

Practices

Vishukkani

The Malayalam word "kani" literally means "that which is seen first", so "Vishukkani" means "that which is seen first on Vishu". The traditional belief is that one's future is a function of what one experiences, that the new year will be better if one views auspicious joyful things as the first thing on Vishu. Therefore, Malayali's spend the day before preparing a setting, usually a tray, of auspicious items. This setting is the first thing they see when they wake up on the Vishu day.

The Vishukkani setting consists of items such as rice, golden lemon, golden cucumber, coconut cut open, jack fruit, Kanmashi, betel leaves, arecanut, Aranmula kannadi (Vaalkannadi), golden colour Konna flowers (Cassia fistula) which bloom in the season of Vishu, nilavilakku, idol of Vishnu, and other auspicious items. Mirror in Vishukani is a symbol of seeing yourself as a part of abundance you see in the form of Pani.

The tradition is that elders light the lamps after waking up, then wakes up juniors in the family. As soon as you wake up, you walk to the kani eyes closed, and sees Kani as the first scene of the year.

Vishu Sadhya

The Sadhya (feast) is a major part of all Kerala festivals. However, special dishes called Vishu Kanji, Thoran and Vishu katta are also made. The Kanji is made of rice, coconut milk and spices. Vishu katta is a delicacy prepared from freshly harvested rice powder and coconut milk served with jaggery. For Thoran, the side dish, there are also mandatory ingredients. Other important Vishu delicacies include Veppampoorasam (a bitter preparation of neem) and Mampazhappulissery (a sour or ripe mango soup) Even temple offerings called bewu bella, include a mix of sweet jaggery, bitter neem, and other flavors.

The mixing of sweet, salty, sour, bitter and astringent flavors for the new year Vishu meal is similar to the pacchadi food prepared on new year day such as Ugadi by Hindus in Karnataka, Telangana and Andhra Pradesh in the Indian subcontinent. These traditional festive recipes, that combine different flavors, are a symbolic reminder that one must expect all flavors of experiences in the coming new year, that no event or episode is wholly sweet or bitter, experiences are transitory and ephemeral, and to make the most from them.

Padakkam

The word 'Padakkam' in Malayalam means firecrackers. Firecrackers are burst during Vishu the same way north Indians burst firecrackers during Diwali.

Konna

Konna (Cassia fistula), commonly known as golden shower is the flower of the Vishu festival.

Other customs

The tradition of buying of new clothes for the occasion of Vishu is called Puthukodi or Vishukodi. There is also a popular tradition of elders giving money to younger ones or dependents of the family. This is called Vishukkaineetam. Another tradition is of giving alms and contributing to community charity. Children enjoy setting off firecrackers.

Pathamudayam
Pathamudayam is celebrated on the 10th day of Medam Month in Malayalam Era and 10th day after Vishu. According to the tradition, ‘Pathamudayam’ is the day when the sun is most powerful and astrological science support the believe. To symbolise the ten sunrises from Vishu, traditional oil lamps with 10 wicks are lit in every house.

Related holidays
Vishu, which used to be the Kerala new year day, is celebrated elsewhere but called by other names. It is called Vaisakhi by Hindus and Sikhs in north and central India, which marks the solar new year, and Tamil New Year day called Puthandu. The new year day on or next to 14 April every year, is also the new year for many Buddhist communities in parts of southeast Asia such as Myanmar and Cambodia, likely an influence of their shared culture in the 1st millennium CE.

Vishu is known as Bishu which is celebrated on Baisakh 1 of Nepal 🇳🇵 calendar in Farwest Province of Nepal.It is the most important festival in that region.

However, this is not the universal new year for all Hindus. For some, such as those in and near Gujarat, the new year festivities coincide with the five day Diwali festival. For many others, the new year falls on Ugadi and Gudi Padwa, which falls a few weeks earlier.

See also

 Indian New Year
 Bisu Parba
 Gudhi Padwa
 Onam
 Bihu
 Vaisakhi
 Pohela Boishakh
 Tamil Puthandu
 Songkran, a Buddhist New Year festival around 14 April, celebrated in Thailand, Cambodia, Laos etc.
 Ugadi, New year of many people of Karnataka, Telangana and Andhra Pradesh.

References

Festivals in Kerala
New Year in India
April observances
New Year celebrations